Cresera tinguaensis is a moth of the family Erebidae. It was described by Rego Barros in 1957. It is found in Brazil.

References

Phaegopterina
Moths described in 1957